Antoine Cresp de Saint-Césaire  (Saint-Cézaire-sur-Siagne, 19 October 1731 — Northumberland, 12 April 1782) was a French Navy officer. He served in the War of American Independence.

Biography 
Saint-Césaire was born in Saint-Cézaire-sur-Siagne on 19 October 1731 to Suzanne-Roseline de Grasse and to François Cresp de Saint-Cézaire. He was nephew to De Grasse.

He was promoted to captain, and made a Knight in the Order of Saint Louis. Saint-Césaire was close to Mirabeau, as was best man at his wedding.

He took part in the Battle of the Chesapeake on 5 September 1781 as De Grasse's flag captain on the 110-gun Ville de Paris. 

Saint-Césaire captained the 74-gun Northumberland at the Battle of the Saintes on 12 April 1782. He was killed in action.

Legacy 
A plaque was unveiled on 3 July 1976 at the city hall of Saint-Cézaire-sur-Siagne by Admiral Frederick C. Turner, Commander of the United States Sixth Fleet, Rear-Admiral Fernand Victor Robin, commander of the Mediterranean squadron of the French Navy, and Marcel Andreis, the Mayor.

Sources and references 
 Notes

Citations

References
 
 

French Navy officers
French military personnel of the American Revolutionary War